Napier Recreation Ground was a cricket ground in Napier, Hawke's Bay, New Zealand. It was located on Carlyle Street, opposite Chaucer Street. The ground first held a first-class match when Hawke's Bay played Wellington in 1884.  Hawke's Bay would play nineteen further first-class matches there, the last of which came in 1913 against Auckland.  During this period the ground played host to the touring Fijians, Marylebone Cricket Club and Australians.

References

External links
Napier Recreation Ground at ESPNcricinfo
Napier Recreation Ground at CricketArchive

Defunct cricket grounds in New Zealand
Sports venues in the Hawke's Bay Region
Sport in Napier, New Zealand